The 1960 Major League Baseball season was played from April 12 to October 13, 1960. It was the final season contested by 16 clubs and the final season that a 154-game schedule was played in both the American League and the National League.  The AL began using the 162-game schedule the following season, with the NL following suit in 1962.

The season ended with the Pittsburgh Pirates, led by second baseman Bill Mazeroski, defeating the New York Yankees, led by outfield sluggers Mickey Mantle and Roger Maris in the World Series.  The series ending, with Mazeroski hitting a walk-off home run in Game 7, is among the most memorable in baseball history.

Awards and honors
Most Valuable Player
Roger Maris, New York Yankees (AL) 
Dick Groat, Pittsburgh Pirates (NL)
Cy Young Award
Vern Law, Pittsburgh Pirates 
Rookie of the Year 
Ron Hansen, Baltimore Orioles (AL)
Frank Howard, Los Angeles Dodgers (NL)
The Sporting News Player of the Year Award
Roger Maris, New York Yankees
The Sporting News Pitcher of the Year Award
Chuck Estrada, Baltimore Orioles (AL)
Vern Law, Pittsburgh Pirates (NL)
The Sporting News Manager of the Year Award
Danny Murtaugh, Pittsburgh Pirates
Gold Glove Award
Bobby Shantz (P) New York Yankees (AL) 
Sherm Lollar (C) Chicago White Sox (AL) 
Vic Power (1B) Cleveland Indians (AL) 
Nellie Fox (2B) Chicago White Sox (AL) 
Brooks Robinson (3B) Baltimore Orioles (AL) 
Luis Aparicio (SS) Chicago White Sox (AL) 
Minnie Miñoso (OF) Cleveland Indians (AL) 
Roger Maris (OF) New York Yankees (AL) 
Jim Landis (OF) Chicago White Sox (AL)

MLB statistical leaders

Standings

American League

National League

Postseason

Bracket

Managers

American League

National League

Home Field Attendance

Events

January–February
January 5 – The Continental League, a proposed third major league, gets an assurance of Congressional support from New York Senator Kenneth Keating.
February 4 – For the second straight election, the Baseball Writers' Association of America (BBWAA) voters fail to elect a new member to the Baseball Hall of Fame. Edd Roush gets 146 votes, but 202 are necessary for election. Sam Rice (143) and Eppa Rixey (142) are next in line. 
February 18 – Walter O'Malley, owner of the Los Angeles Dodgers, completes the purchase of the Chavez Ravine area in Los Angeles by paying $494,000 for property valued at $92,000. 
February 20 – Branch Rickey meets with officials of the proposed Western Carolinas League about pooling talent for Continental League clubs. 
February 23 – Demolition of Ebbets Field begins. Lucy Monroe sings the national anthem, and Roy Campanella is given an urn of dirt from behind home plate.

March–April
March 13 – The Chicago White Sox unveil new road uniforms with the players' names above the number on the back, another innovation by Sox owner Bill Veeck.
March 24 – Commissioner Ford Frick says he will not allow the Continental League to pool players in the Western Carolinas League as it would violate existing agreements between the major and minor leagues. 
March 26 – Baltimore Orioles general manager Lee MacPhail moves a series between the Orioles and Cincinnati Reds from Havana, Cuba to Miami, Florida. The Reds, with a farm club in Cuba, want the series in Havana, but the Orioles fear increased political unrest in the area. 
April 4 – The Chicago White Sox send catcher Earl Battey, first baseman Don Mincher, and cash to the Washington Senators for first baseman Roy Sievers.
April 5 – The San Francisco Giants purchase first baseman Dale Long from the Chicago Cubs.
April 12:
With 42,269 fans in attendance, the San Francisco Giants edge the St. Louis Cardinals, 3–1, in the first game at San Francisco's Candlestick Park. Sam Jones pitches a three-hitter, and Cardinals outfielder Leon Wagner hits the first home run in the $15 million stadium. 
Chuck Essegian swats an 11th-inning pinch-hit home run as the Los Angeles Dodgers beat the Chicago Cubs, 3–2, before a record Opening Day crowd of 67,550 at the Los Angeles Memorial Coliseum. The home run is Essegian's third straight as a pinch hitter, including two in the 1959 World Series. Don Drysdale pitches all the way, striking out 14, for the win over Don Elston. 
In a deal that will haunt the Cleveland Indians, general manager Frank Lane sends Norm Cash to the Detroit Tigers for third baseman Steve Demeter. Cash would be Detroit's regular first baseman for the next 14 years and hit 373 home runs for them, while Demeter would play only four games for Cleveland.
April 14
 After the Philadelphia Phillies lose their Opening Day game to the Cincinnati Reds 9–4, Phillies manager Eddie Sawyer resigns, ending his managerial career.
April 17:
On Easter Sunday, Cleveland Indians general manager Frank Lane completes his second trade with the Detroit Tigers in five days when he sends Rocky Colavito, the American League's co-leader in home runs for 1959, to the Motor City in exchange for Harvey Kuenn, the league's defending batting champion. Colavito, an unparalleled fan favorite in Cleveland, would hit 173 home runs before returning to the Tribe in 1965. Kuenn would report to Cleveland, pull a muscle, and never be the same hitter. He would be traded after one season.
Eddie Mathews of the Milwaukee Braves hits his 300th home run, off Robin Roberts, plus a double and a triple, as Milwaukee beats the Philadelphia Phillies, 8–4. To date, only Jimmie Foxx hit his 300th at a younger age.
April 18:
In the American League opener at Washington, D.C., a week after the National League start, President Dwight D. Eisenhower throws out the first ball, then watches the Senators' Camilo Pascual strike out 15 Boston Red Sox batters to tie Walter Johnson's team record. Boston's only run in a 10–1 loss is a Ted Williams home run. 
Indians general manager Frank Lane continues to swap, sending Cleveland favorite Herb Score to the Chicago White Sox for Barry Latman. Score and Rocky Colavito, traded three days previously, were the last two players to predate Lane's arrival in Cleveland.
April 19:
Before a home crowd of 41,661, Minnie Miñoso celebrates his return to the Chicago White Sox with a fourth-inning grand slam against the Kansas City Athletics. Leading off the bottom of the ninth with the score tied 9–9, Miñoso hits a solo homer for his sixth RBI. 
On Patriots' Day at Fenway Park, Roger Maris makes his debut with the New York Yankees as he goes 4-for-5, including two home runs with four RBI. The Yankees spoil the Boston Red Sox home opener with an 8–4 win.
The Detroit Tigers and Cleveland Indians play the longest season opener in major-league history, a 15-inning affair won by the Tigers 4–2 at Cleveland Stadium.
April 29 – At home, the St. Louis Cardinals crush the Chicago Cubs, 16–6. Stan Musial plays his 1,000th game at first base, becoming the first major league player ever with that many at two positions (1,513 games in the outfield). A bright spot for the Cubs is Ernie Banks, who hits two home runs to break Gabby Hartnett's club record of 231 homers.

May
May 1 – Skinny Brown of the Baltimore Orioles pitches a 4–1 win over the Yankees. Brown allows just one hit, a first-inning home run by Mickey Mantle. Rookie Ron Hansen matches Mantle to up his RBI total to an American League high 32.
May 4:
The Chicago Cubs make a trade with WGN (AM), plucking Lou Boudreau out of the broadcast booth to replace Charlie Grimm (6–11) as Cubs manager. "Jolly Cholly", meanwhile, replaces Boudreau behind the mike. The Cubs win, 5–1, over the Pirates as pitcher Dick Ellsworth gains his first ML victory. 
Baltimore Orioles catcher Gus Triandos sets a pair of American League records with three passed balls in one inning (6th) and four in one game, but knuckleballer Hoyt Wilhelm, making a rare start, goes seven innings and gets credit for a 6–4 Baltimore win over the Chicago White Sox. Early Wynn records his 2,000th strikeout in a no-decision effort for Chicago. Triandos' passed ball mark for an inning will be tied by reserve backstop Joe Ginsberg in six days, and Tom Egan will collect five PBs in 1970 to erase Triandos' name off the list. 
May 6 – The Dodgers send veteran outfielder Sandy Amorós to Detroit for first baseman Gail Harris. 
May 7:
Pitcher Larry Sherry and catcher Norm Sherry of the Dodgers become the 10th sibling battery in ML history. Norm belts an 11th-inning home run to give his reliever brother Larry a 3–2 win against the Phillies. 
Boston Red Sox pitcher Bill Monbouquette allows just one hit in beating the visiting Detroit Tigers, 5–0. Neil Chrisley's double is the only Tigers hit. 
May 10:
Catcher Joe Ginsberg of the Orioles loses a struggle with Hoyt Wilhelm's knuckleball facing the Athletics, and ties the record set six days earlier by teammate Gus Triandos with three passed balls in one inning.
Grand slams by Boston Red Sox teammates Vic Wertz and Rip Repulski at Fenway Park give Boston a 9–7 win over the Chicago White Sox. A former National League veteran, Repulski's eighth-inning shot off Don Ferrarese comes on his first American League at bat. 
May 11:
Sam Jones pitches a two-hitter and draws a bases-loaded walk for the only run, as the Giants edge the visitors Phillies, 1–0. Jim Owens is the loser. 
The Phillies announce a trade of first baseman Ed Bouchee and pitcher Don Cardwell to the Chicago Cubs for second baseman Tony Taylor and catcher Cal Neeman. 
May 12 – Duplicating Sam Jones' effort of the previous day, the Giants' Jack Sanford pitches a two-hit, 1–0 win over the Phillies. Sanford matches Jones by striking out 11 and walking three. 
May 13:
Mike McCormick's shutout of the Los Angeles Dodgers is the third straight by a San Francisco Giants pitcher, following two-hitters against the Philadelphia Phillies by Sam Jones and Jack Sanford. The first-place Giants have seven straight wins. 
Dick Groat of the Pittsburgh Pirates becomes the first National League player since Connie Ryan in 1953 to go 6-for-6 as Pittsburgh beats the Milwaukee Braves, 8–2. 
The Philadelphia Phillies suffer their third straight 1–0 shutout, losing to the host Cincinnati Reds. The Phillies, losers of back-to-back 1–0 games in San Francisco, tie the major-league record for consecutive 1–0 losses. Jim O'Toole's win is Cincinnati's ninth straight. 
Two days after being traded from the Phillies to the Cubs, Don Cardwell pitches a no-hitter against the St. Louis Cardinals. A brilliant, leaping catch of Carl Sawatski's line drive by George Altman in the eighth inning saves Cardwell's gem. Ernie Banks' home run paces the 4–0 win, the first no-hitter against the Cards since May 11, 1919. 
May 19 – The New York Yankees send shortstop Andy Carey to the Kansas City Athletics for slugger Bob Cerv. Cerv had been with the Yankees for five years before going to KC, where he hit 38 home runs in 1958 and was chosen as the American League left fielder in the All-Star Game over Ted Williams. Cerv would be claimed in the 1960 MLB expansion draft and the Yankees would reacquire him. 
May 25 – George Crowe of the St. Louis Cardinals set a major league record with his 11th pinch-hit home run, off Don McMahon, as the Cardinals win, 5–3, over the Braves. Crowe began the season tied with Smoky Burgess and Gus Zernial in most career pinch home runs. 
May 27:
Since there is no rule limiting the size or shape of the catcher's mitt, Baltimore manager Paul Richards combats the team passed-ball problem while catching Hoyt Wilhelm (38 in 1959; 11 so far this year) by devising an oversized mitt to gather in Wilhelm's fluttering knuckleball. It is half again as large as the standard glove and 40 ounces heavier. Wilhelm goes the distance in beating New York, 3–2, at Yankee Stadium. Catcher Clint Courtney has no passed balls behind the plate. 
Camilo Pascual strikes out 13 but the Washington Senators lose to the Boston Red Sox, 4–3. It is Pascual's third loss to Boston this year. 
May 28 – Manager Casey Stengel is hospitalized with a virus and high fever and will miss 13 games. The Yankees go 7–6 under interim manager Ralph Houk.

June
June 12 – In a record-tying three-hour-and-52-minute, 9-inning game, Willie McCovey's pinch-hit grand slam, the first slam of his career, and Orlando Cepeda's three-run double pace the Giants to a 16–7 rout of the Braves. 
June 19 – In a brilliant pair of pitching performances, Orioles pitchers Hoyt Wilhelm and Milt Pappas throw shutouts to beat the host Detroit Tigers. Wilhelm allows two hits in winning the opener, 2–0, over Jim Bunning, and Pappas allows three hits in winning the nightcap, 1–0, over Don Mossi. Jim Gentile and Ron Hansen collect home runs as catcher Clint Courtney, using the big glove designed by manager Paul Richards, is twice charged with batter interference, the first loading the bases in the 4th inning. 
June 24 – Willie Mays belts two home runs and makes 10 putouts to lead the Giants in a 5–3 win at Cincinnati. Mays adds three RBI, three runs scored, a single and a steal of home.
June 26 – Hoping to speed up the election process, the Hall of Fame changes its voting procedures. The new rules allow the Special Veterans Committee to vote annually, rather than every other year, and to induct up to two players a year. The BBWAA is authorized to hold a runoff election of the top 30 vote getters if no one is elected in the first ballot. 
June 30 – Dick Stuart blasts three consecutive home runs, as the Pirates split with the Giants. Stuart drives in seven runs and joins Ralph Kiner as the second Pirates player to hit three home runs in a game at Forbes Field.

July
July 4 – Mickey Mantle's three-run first-inning home run off Hal Woodeshick is the 300th of his career. Mantle becomes the 18th major leaguer to join the 300 home run club, but the Yankees drop a 9–8 decision to the Senators.
July 9 – Jim Coates suffers his first loss after nine straight wins, and 14 straight over two seasons, as the Boston Red Sox beat the Yankees, 6–5. The Sox are led by Vic Wertz, who hit a home run, double and single to drive in four runs. Coates' major-league career-record is 17–2. 
July 11 – At Kansas City Municipal Stadium, one-hit three-innings shutout pitching by Bob Friend and home runs by Ernie Banks and Del Crandall pace the National League to a 5–4 win over the American League in the first of two All-Star Games. Friend, of the Pittsburgh Pirates, has notched two of the NL's last three All-Star wins. 
July 13 – At Yankee Stadium, Vern Law becomes the second Pirates pitcher to win a 1960 All-Star Game, working two scoreless innings. Stan Musial comes off the National League bench and hits his record sixth and last All-Star Game home run. Willie Mays, Ken Boyer and Eddie Mathews also homer in the 6–0 NL win, the third shutout in All-Star Game history. Law (1st, 2nd) combines the eight-hit shutout along with Johnny Podres (3rd), Stan Williams (5th, 6th), Larry Jackson (7th), Bill Henry (8th) and Lindy McDaniel (9th). Whitey Ford is the loser.
July 18 – The National League votes to expand to 10 clubs if the Continental League does not join organized baseball. The new NL clubs would invade CL territories. 
July 19:
In a spectacular ML debut, Juan Marichal of the San Francisco Giants pitches no-hit ball until Clay Dalrymple pinch-hit singles with two out in the 7th inning. Marichal winds up with 12 strikeouts and a one-hit 2–0 win against the Phillies, becoming the first National League pitcher since 1900 to debut with a one-hitter. 
Roy Sievers' 21-game hitting streak, the longest for any player in the season, ends, but Chicago White Sox teammate Luis Aparicio's inside-the-park home run and Billy Pierce's shutout beat Boston, 6–0. 
Senators ace Pedro Ramos pitches a one-hit, 5–0 shutout over Detroit. Rocky Colavito's leadoff single in the eighth inning, a grounder that eludes shortstop José Valdivielso, is the lone safety. 
July 20 – At Cleveland Municipal Stadium, Mickey Mantle golfs a Gary Bell pitch over the auxiliary scoreboard into the distant upper deck in right field, matching Luke Easter as the only major league players to reach that spot. Cleveland holds on for an 8–6 win over the Yankees.
July 21 – Robin Roberts pitches his third career one-hitter, and the third one-hitter of the season in new Candlestick Park. Felipe Alou spoils Roberts' no-hit bid in the fifth inning of a 3–0 Phillies victory. Third baseman Joe Morgan fields the hit, but falls down and cannot make a throw. 
July 22 – At Fenway Park, the Boston Red Sox down the Cleveland Indians, 6–4. Vic Wertz has a three-run home run and four RBI. Ted Williams also homers, and in the 7th inning, steals second base. Williams sets a major league record as the only player to steal bases in four consecutive decades. He would be matched by Rickey Henderson in 2000. The Indians' Jimmy Piersall homers twice, with both round-trippers coming off winner Ike Delock. 
July 23 – Kansas City outfielder Whitey Herzog hits into the only all-Cuban triple play in ML history. The action goes from Washington Senators starting pitcher Pedro Ramos, to first baseman Julio Bécquer, to shortstop José Valdivielso. The victory, however, goes to reliever Chuck Stobbs (7–2) as the Senators take an 8–3 decision. Harmon Killebrew has a two-run home run. 
July 30 – Just as he predicts, Philadelphia Phillies pitcher Art Mahaffey picks off the first batter to get a hit against him. Then with the next batter to get a hit, he does it again. Curt Flood and Bill White of the St. Louis Cardinals are the base runner victims, but St. Louis still wins, 6–3. In his next game, the first batter to get a hit off Mahaffey will be Jim Marshall, and Mahaffey will pick him off as well.

August
August 2 – In an agreement with the major leagues, the Continental League abandons plans to join the American League and National League. Walter O'Malley, chairman of the NL Expansion Committee, says, "We immediately will recommend expansion and that we would like to do it in 1961." Milwaukee Braves owner Lou Perini proposes a compromise that four of the CL territories be admitted to the current majors in orderly expansion. Branch Rickey's group quickly accepts. The Continental League ends without playing a game. 
August 3 – In an unusual move, Cleveland Indians GM Frank Lane trades managers with Detroit Tigers GM Bill DeWitt. The Indians' Joe Gordon (49–46) is dealt to the Tigers for Jimmy Dykes (44–52). For one game, until the pair can change places, Jo-Jo White pilots the Indians and Billy Hitchcock guides the Tigers.
August 7 – The Chicago White Sox win a pair from the Washington Senators, with reliever Gerry Staley picking up two victories. Staley will be 13–8, all in relief, with both wins and losses topping the American League relievers. 
August 8 – Before a day crowd of 48,323, the largest day crowd ever at Comiskey Park, cheer White Sox pitcher Billy Pierce four-hit victory over the Yankees, 9–1. Pierce faces just 31 batters. 
August 9 – With fine relief pitching of Lindy McDaniel in the opener and a five-hitter by Curt Simmons in the nightcap, the St. Louis Cardinals sweep the Philadelphia Phillies, 5–4 and 6–0. Phillies' Tony Taylor ties a major league record for a second baseman by going the entire doubleheader (18 innings) without a putout – the first to achieve the feat since Connie Ryan, also of the Phillies, on June 14, 1953. 
August 10 – Ted Williams blasts a pair of home runs and a double to pace the Red Sox to a 6–1 win over the Cleveland Indians. Williams has 21 homers for the season. The first of the two today, #512, moves him past Mel Ott into fourth place on the all-time list. After the game, Williams announces that he will retire at the end of the season.
August 18 – Facing just the minimum 27 batters, Lew Burdette of the Milwaukee Braves almost pitches a perfect game, instead settling for a 1–0 no-hitter against the Phillies. Tony González, the only Phillies base runner, reached first base in the fifth inning after being hit by a pitch and was wiped out in a double play. The Milwaukee pitcher also scores the only run of the game. 
August 20 – Ted Williams draws the 2,000th walk of his career in the Red Sox' split of a twi-night doubleheader with the Orioles. Williams joins Babe Ruth as the only major leaguers to collect 2,000 walks. Rickey Henderson in 2000, and Barry Bonds in 2003, will join the select 2,000 walks group. 
August 23 – Following up his no-hitter, Lew Burdette fires his third shutout in a row, pitching the Milwaukee Braves to a 7–0 win over the Los Angeles Dodgers.
August 27 – After pitching 32 shutout innings, Braves pitcher Lew Burdette gives up a Felipe Alou home run as San Francisco defeats the Braves 3–1.
August 30 – Boston Red Sox second baseman Pete Runnels goes 6-for-7, as Boston edge the Tigers in the 15-inning opener of a twin bill. Runnels' 15th-inning double brings Frank Malzone home with the winning run to win, 5–4. Runnels has three more hits in the nightcap victory, 3–2 in 10 innings. His six hits are the most in an American League game since July 8, 1955. With 9-for-11 in the doubleheader, Runnels ties the major league record.

September
September 2 – Boston's Ted Williams hits a home run off Don Lee of the Senators. Williams had homered against Lee's father, Thornton, 20 years earlier.
September 3:
A battle of left-handed pitchers features Sandy Koufax of the Los Angeles Dodgers against Mike McCormick of the San Francisco Giants. Felipe Alou's home run gives McCormick a 1–0 win, his second 1–0 win against Los Angeles in 1960. 
September 10 – In Detroit, Yankees Mickey Mantle hit a home run in the sixth inning, the ball clearing the right field roof and landing in the Brooks Lumber Yard across Trumbull Avenue. In June 1985, Mantle's blow was retroactively measured at 643 feet, and will be listed in the Guinness Book of World Records at that distance. 
September 13–18-year-old outfielder Danny Murphy becomes the youngest Chicago Cubs player to hit a home run when he clouts a three-run homer off Bob Purkey of the Cincinnati Reds, as the Reds win 8–6 at home. Murphy will play just 49 games for the Cubs from 1960–62. He will come back as a pitcher for the Chicago White Sox in 1969–70. 
September 15 – Willie Mays ties the modern major league record with three triples in a game against the Phillies. The last National League player to hit three triples in a game was Roberto Clemente, in 1958. 
September 16:
At the age of 39, Warren Spahn notches his 11th 20-win season with a 4–0 no-hitter against the Phillies. Spahn also sets a Milwaukee club record with 15 strikeouts in handing the last-place Phils their 90th loss of the year. 
The Baltimore Orioles (83–58) and New York Yankees (82–57) open a crucial four games series with the Orioles just .002 in back of New York. Three days later, during a doubleheader, the Yankees will sweep Baltimore. The faltering Birds, now four back, will end up in second place, eight games back.
September 18 – At Wrigley Field, Ernie Banks sets a record by drawing his 27th intentional walk of the season. 
September 19 – The Chicago White Sox' pennant hopes are damaged with a nightcap 7–6 loss to the Detroit Tigers, after they win the opener, 8–4. Pinch hitter Norm Cash scores the decisive run in the second game; he thus ends the season by grounding into no double plays, becoming the first American League player since league records on this were started in 1940. Teammates Dick McAuliffe and Roger Repoz will duplicate this in 1968.
September 20 – Boston Red Sox outfielder Carroll Hardy pinch-hits for Ted Williams, who is forced to leave the game after fouling a ball off his ankle, and grounds into a double play. On May 31, 1961, Hardy will pinch hit for rookie Carl Yastrzemski, making him the only player to go to bat for both future Hall of Famers. Hardy also hit his first major league home run pinch-hitting for Roger Maris when both were at Cleveland (May 18, 1958). 
September 25:
For the first time since 1927, the Pittsburgh Pirates are headed for the World Series.
Ralph Terry clinches the New York Yankees' 25th pennant with a 4–3 win over the Boston Red Sox. Luis Arroyo saves the win. It is Casey Stengel's 10th pennant in 12 years at New York. 
September 28 – In his last major league at bat, Ted Williams picks out a 1–1 pitch by Baltimore's Jack Fisher and drives it 450 feet into the right-center field seats behind the Boston bullpen. It is Williams' 521st and last career home run, putting him third on the all-time list. Williams stays in the dugout, ignoring the thunderous ovation at Fenway Park and refusing to tip his hat to the hometown fans.

October
October 2 – The Baltimore Orioles defeat the Washington Senators 2–1 at Griffith Stadium in the Senators' final game before their move to the Minneapolis-St. Paul area. Milt Pappas wins the pitchers' duel against Pedro Ramos, who gives up a home run to Jackie Brandt for the deciding run.
October 3 – The New York Yankees head into the World Series with a 15-game winning streak, the 8th longest streak in the American League this century, after Dale Long's two-run 9th-inning home run gives them an 8–7 win over the Boston Red Sox. The 193 home runs are an AL season record, three better than the 1956 Yankees. RBI leader Roger Maris drives in three runs, but falls one home run short of Mickey Mantle's league-high 40. 
October 5 – In a portent of things to come, Bill Mazeroski's two-run 5th-inning home run off Jim Coates is the difference as Pittsburgh beats the Yankees 6–4 in its first World Series win since 1925. Roy Face survives a two-run 9th-inning Elston Howard home run to preserve Vern Law's victory. 
October 6 – Mickey Mantle hits two home runs in a Yankees 16–3 victory at Forbes Field, evening the World Series. A seven-run 6th inning overwhelms Pittsburgh. 
October 8 – At Yankee Stadium, Bobby Richardson collects six RBI, including a grand slam off reliever Clem Labine in a six-run first inning, and Whitey Ford pitches a four-hitter 10–0 shutout to give the Yankees a 2–1 World Series lead, spoiling Pittsburgh manager Danny Murtaugh's 43rd birthday. 
October 9 – Vern Law wins again, thanks to his own RBI single and Bill Virdon's two-run hit. Roy Face retires the final eight batters in order. The Pittsburgh Pirates 3–2 win evens the 1960 World Series. 
October 10 – Bill Mazeroski stars again. His two-run double stakes Harvey Haddix to a 3–0 lead. Roy Face is called on once more for another hitless effort to preserve a 5–2 win over the Yankees and 3–2 World Series lead for the surprising Pirates. 
October 12 – In Game Six of the World Series, Whitey Ford preserves the Yankees hopes with a seven-hit shutout at Forbes Field. Bob Friend is bombed again as the Yankees coasts 12–0. Bobby Richardson's two run-scoring triples give him a WS record of 12 RBI. 
October 13 – In a 9–9 tie, Bill Mazeroski leads off the last of the ninth inning and hits what is arguably the most dramatic home run in WS history, off Yankees Ralph Terry, to give the Pittsburgh Pirates a 10–9 win and the World Series Championship. The drama of Mazeroski's home run was heightened by the excitement that preceded the home run: seven runs were scored by both teams in a wild and wacky bottom of the eighth and top of the ninth.  An oddity in this game – it is the only World Series game with no strikeouts recorded. Another oddity, this one to the 1960 World Series itself – Mazeroski's home run makes this 1960 World Series the only World Series in major league history won by a home run in the bottom of the ninth inning of the seventh and deciding game.  Despite Mazeroski's heroics, however, Bobby Richardson is named the Series MVP, as the Yankees outscore Pittsburgh, 55 to 27. 
October 17 – The National League votes to admit Houston and New York City teams to the league in 1962, the first structural change since 1900, and to go to a 10-team league. 
October 18 – Instituting a mandatory retirement age of 65, New York Yankees co-owners Dan Topping and Del Webb relieve Casey Stengel as the team manager. Stengel says "I wasn't retired—they fired me." The veteran skipper has a 1,149–696 career record.  Stengel returned to managing in 1962, when he became the first manager of the New York Mets.
October 20 – Coach Ralph Houk, at 41 age, is named to succeed Casey Stengel as the Yankees manager. Houk had briefly led the Yankees in 1960 when Stengel was hospitalized. 
October 27 – Trying to jump ahead of the National League, the American League admits Los Angeles and Minneapolis teams to the league with plans to have the new clubs begin competition in 1961 in the new 10-team league. Calvin Griffith is given permission to move the existing Washington Senators franchise to Minneapolis–Saint Paul. (An expansion team, also called the Senators, will be placed in Washington.) American League president Joe Cronin says the league will play a 162-game schedule, with 18 games against each opponent. The National League will balk, saying the two expansions are not analogous and that the American League was not invited to move into LA.

November–December
November 2 – Hank Greenberg asks for American League dates at the Los Angeles Coliseum, home of the National League Dodgers. Greenberg and Bill Veeck are expected to run the new Los Angeles club in the AL. On November 17, Greenberg will drop out of the bidding to run the new franchise.
November 22 – The American League proposes that both leagues expand to nine teams in 1961 and begin interleague play. It will delay entering the Los Angeles market if the National League agrees. 
November 26 – Twins is the appropriate new name chosen for the club transplanted from Washington, D.C. to the Twin Cities of Minneapolis–Saint Paul.
December 5 – American League president Joe Cronin suggests that if the National League starts its new New York City franchise in 1961, the AL will stay out of Los Angeles until 1962. The NL turned down the suggested compromise of November 22 because Houston will not be ready in 1961. 
December 6 – A group headed by movie star Gene Autry and former football star Bob Reynolds is awarded the new American League Los Angeles Angels. Charlie Finley withdraws his bid for Los Angeles and offers to purchase control of the Kansas City Athletics. On December 20, Finley will buys the 52 percent of the A's in Arnold Johnson's estate. 
December 21 – Chicago Cubs owner P.K. Wrigley says his team will have no manager, but will use a college of coaches.

See also
1960 Nippon Professional Baseball season

References

External links
1960 Major League Baseball season schedule

 
Major League Baseball seasons